The 1983–84 Richmond Spiders men's basketball team represented the University of Richmond in National Collegiate Athletic Association (NCAA) Division I college basketball during the 1983–84 season. Richmond competed as a member of the ECAC South (now known as the Colonial Athletic Association) under head basketball coach Dick Tarrant and played its home games at the Robins Center.

Richmond finished first in the ECAC South regular-season standings with a 7–3 conference record, and won the ECAC South tournament to earn an automatic bid to the 1984 NCAA tournament. One of two teams assigned the No. 12 seed, Richmond secured a victory over Rider in the preliminary round, 89-65. In the opening round, the Spiders upset No. 5 seed Auburn, 72–71. Richmond lost to No. 4 seed Indiana, 75–67, in the round of 32.

Roster

Schedule and results

|-
!colspan=9 style=| Regular season

|-
!colspan=9 style=| ECAC South tournament

|-
!colspan=9 style=| NCAA Tournament

Awards and honors
Johnny Newman – ECAC South Player of the Year

References

Richmond Spiders men's basketball seasons
Richmond
1983 in sports in Virginia
1984 in sports in Virginia
Richmond